Tibor Benkő (28 April 1905 – 12 April 1988) was a Hungarian fencer and modern pentathlete. He competed at the 1932 Summer Olympics.

References

External links
 

1905 births
1988 deaths
People from Sfântu Gheorghe
Hungarian male épée fencers
Hungarian male modern pentathletes
Olympic fencers of Hungary
Olympic modern pentathletes of Hungary
Fencers at the 1932 Summer Olympics
Modern pentathletes at the 1932 Summer Olympics
20th-century Hungarian people